Yarty is an historic estate in the parish of Membury in Devon, and was from the 14th century until 1726 for many centuries the principal seat of the Fry family. It takes its name from the River Yarty which flows near or through the estate. During the reigns of King Richard II (1377-1399) or King Henry IV (1399-1413) William (or John) Fry inherited the estate by marriage to the sister and heiress of Simon de Yarty, who died without progeny. The mansion house was "newly builded and augmented" by Nicholas Fry (d.1632), Sheriff of Devon in 1626, whose mural monument survives in the Yarty Chapel in Membury Church.

The following text appeared in "Report & Transactions of the Devonshire Association Vol 39 (1907)" p. 134:

The story of the ghost returning home "at the rate of a cock's stride each year" also occurs in Devon in relation to Dowrich an historic estate in the parish of Sandford.

Further reading
The Mirror of Literature, Amusement, and Instruction, Volume 2, 11 November 1843, pp. 309–11 "Membury Church" (refers to Yarty throughout as "Tarty")
Fry, Edward A., Fry of Yarty, published in Proceedings of the Somersetshire Archaeological and Natural History Society, vol.49, 1903, pp. 65–70

References

Historic estates in Devon